Kagemaru can refer to:

People:
Jōya Kagemaru, an artist
 Kagemaru Himeno, an artist working on Pokémon Tales

Fictional characters:
Kage-Maru, a character in Virtua Fighter
Kagemaru, a character in Yu-Gi-Oh! GX
A character in Schubibinman Zero (in the Schubibinman series)
A character in The Krion Conquest
Kagemaru, nicknamed Kabamaru, the main character of Igano Kabamaru